Brian S. Porter is an American legislator and Anchorage police chief who served as Speaker of the 21st and 22nd Alaska House of Representatives and Member of 18th, 19th, 20th, 21st and 22nd  Alaska House of Representatives.

Personal life 
He was born in 2 May 1938 in Seattle and currently a resident of Anchorage, Alaska from 1951.

References 

Speakers of the Alaska House of Representatives
Members of the Alaska House of Representatives